The Birds, the Bees and the Italians is a 1966 Italian film directed by Pietro Germi. Its original Italian title is Signore & Signori, which means 'Ladies and Gentlemen'.

The anthology film is a sex comedy that presents three storylines, all set in the Italian town of Treviso. In the first story, a husband pretends to be impotent as a cover for having an affair. In the second, a bank clerk abandons his wife for his mistress, but the rest of the town's husbands become jealous and unite to conspire against them. In the third, men of the town all seduce a promiscuous teenager, but her father eventually reveals that she is underage, and they face prosecution for statutory rape.

The film shared the Grand Prix with A Man and a Woman at the 1966 Cannes Film Festival. It was later selected for screening as part of the Cannes Classics section at the 2016 Cannes Film Festival.

Cast
 Virna Lisi – Milena Zulian
 Gastone Moschin – Osvaldo Bisigato
 Nora Ricci – Gilda Bisigato
 Alberto Lionello – Toni Gasparini
 Olga Villi – Ippolita Gasparini
 Franco Fabrizi – Lino Benedetti
 Beba Lončar – Noemi Castellan
 Gigi Ballista – Giacinto Castellan
 Carlo Bagno – Bepi Cristofoletto
 Patrizia Valturri – Alda Cristofoletto
 Virgilio Gazzolo – Newspaper editor
 Quinto Parmeggiani – Giovanni Soligo
 Gia Sandri – Betty Soligo
 Moira Orfei – Giorgia Casellato
 Virgilio Scapin – Don Schiavon

References

External links

 
Cannes profile

1966 films
Italian black-and-white films
Palme d'Or winners
Commedia all'italiana
1960s sex comedy films
1960s Italian-language films
Films shot in Veneto
Films directed by Pietro Germi
Films scored by Carlo Rustichelli
Italian anthology films
Films with screenplays by Luciano Vincenzoni
Commedia sexy all'italiana
Films set in Veneto
1966 comedy films
1960s Italian films